Hadji Baba Afshar (افشار، حاجی بابا in Persian) was one of the first medical practitioners in Iran who studied modern medicine in Europe.

He was sent in 1226 AH/1811 CE together with a number of others to study medicine and chemistry in England at the expense of the crown prince and under the supervision of Sir Harford Jones-Brydges.

Although he stayed for eight years in England, he did not receive a degree. Upon return he was the court physician under Mohammad Shah Qajar.

Hajji Baba may have been the inspiration for the best-selling novels, The Adventures of Hajji Baba of Ispahan (1824) and The Adventures of Hajji Baba of Ispahan in England (1828), written by James Justinian Morier. According to Stuart, Ḥāǰǰī Bābā was extremely annoyed at Morier’s use of his name for the title of his novel The Adventures of Hajji Baba of Ispahan.

References

Sources 
 

19th-century Iranian physicians
19th-century deaths
People of Qajar Iran
Court physicians
Iranian expatriates in England
Year of birth unknown
Year of death unknown